Delingha railway station  is a station on the Chinese Qingzang Railway that serves Delingha, a city near the northwest edge of the Tibetan Plateau in Qinghai province, China.

See also

 Qingzang Railway
 List of stations on Qingzang railway

Railway stations in China opened in 1984
Railway stations in Qinghai
Stations on the Qinghai–Tibet Railway
Haixi Mongol and Tibetan Autonomous Prefecture